National Cycle Network (NCN) Route 658 is a Sustrans Regional Route. The full length of the route is part of the Way of the Roses. It is fully signed and open.

Route 
NCN 658 starts at Scarborough Bridge on the west bank of the River Ouse. It runs up Marygate and Bootham, then passes through the historic city walls at Bootham Bar.  It passes York Minster, the Merchant Taylors' Hall and Monk Bar before crossing the River Foss. It leaves the city centre on the Foss Islands Cycle track. The route ends at Tang Hall Lane where it meets NCN 66. Much of the route is traffic free.

History 

The Foss Islands Cycle track runs along the former Derwent Valley Light Railway.
Sections of NCN 658 were originally signed as NCN 66. The route was altered and renumbered during the creation of Way of the Roses Challenge Route.

Prior to the opening of the York bypass in 1976 the A64(T) passed through central York. NCN 658 follows the old A64 route between the Minster and Monk Bar, part of which is now traffic-free.

Related NCN Routes 
Route 658 meets the following routes:

Route 658 is part of the Way of the Roses along with:

References

External links

 Route 658 on the Sustrans website.

Cycleways in England
National Cycle Routes